was a Japanese and Slovenian nurse, promoter of Japanese culture in Yugoslavia.

Life and work
Kondo-Kavese Tsuneko was born in Gifu, Japan, a daughter of court architect Kondo-Kavese Kagijiro. After the Russo-Japanese War, she relocated with her family to Beijing, where she studied medicine, though she did not graduate. In the International Club, she met Ivan Skušek, a Slovenian officer  (1. class superior naval inspector) of Austro-Hungarian Navy who was stationed aboard cruiser SMS Kaiserin Elisabeth. In Beijing couple being married and in 1920 the family (couple, her son and daughter from first marriage) left China and travelled to Ljubljana, where she soon learned Slovenian. She served as head nurse for the Red Cross and became an active council member. She received the Red Cross' highest award in 1962.

She also promoted cultural exchange between Japan and Slovenia (then part of Yugoslavia). Between 1930 and 1960 she held a series of lectures on Japan, first in German and later in Slovenian, which were published in various newspapers. She also lectured on Japan on the then newly established Radio Ljubljana. She died on January 25, 1963. She is buried in Ljubljana, at the Žale cemetery.

Couple arrived from China to Ljubljana with a collection of over 500 pieces of Chinese and Japanese artwork and antiques, which she bequeathed to the Slovene Ethnographic Museum in 1963.

References

1893 births
1963 deaths
Japanese nurses
Slovenian nurses
Yugoslav nurses
Slovenian people of Japanese descent

Japan–Yugoslavia relations
Burials at Žale
People from Gifu
Japanese expatriates in China
Japanese emigrants to Yugoslavia